Céline Yandza (28 May 1932 – 18 October 2013) was a Congolese politician. She became the founding president of the Revolutionary Women's Union of Congo (URFC). In 1968, she was included in the National Revolutionary Council.

Yandza was excluded from the CNR when it was reformed on 31 December 1968. On 15 November 1969 she was substituted by Joséphine Bouanga as URFC president at the second extraordinary URFC congress.

References

1932 births
2013 deaths
20th-century Republic of the Congo women politicians
20th-century Republic of the Congo politicians
Place of birth missing